Daniel Kyri (born October 10, 1994) is an American actor, best known for portraying firefighter Darren Ritter on Chicago Fire.

Early life and education
Kyri was born on October 10, 1994 and grew up on the South Side of Chicago. He performed in plays as a child, crediting his mother for his love of the arts and enrolling him in the After School Matters program when he was 15. In 2007, he appeared in the controversial CBS reality show Kid Nation, going by the name D.K. and winning a $20,000 "gold star" awarded by his peers.

Kyri attended the University of Illinois at Chicago, graduating with a BA in Theater Performance.

Career
Kyri starred in the 2014 short film Perfect Day as Desmond, a composite character based on Derrion Albert. He had roles in Chicago theater productions including Moby Dick, Macbeth and Ms. Blakk for President. In 2015, he portrayed Logan in the film Henry Gamble's Birthday Party, and Brock in the TV mini-series Saranormal. In 2017, he was nominated for a Joseph Jefferson Equity Award for Principal Actor in a Play for Objects in the Mirror at the Goodman Theatre. 

In 2018, Kyri had the title role in the Gift Theatre production of Hamlet, giving what the Chicago Tribune called "a standout performance." With Bea Cordelia, he co-wrote and starred in a web series called The T about the relationship between a white trans woman and a Black queer man in Chicago. It premiered with a screening at the Chicago Cultural Center.

Kyri auditioned for Chicago Fire in 2018, with the role of Darren Ritter initially intended to last 2-3 episodes. He was a recurring guest appearing in most episodes over the next two years, before being promoted to series regular in August 2020. He has a role as a YouTube paranormal investigator in the 2022 Shudder lo-fi horror film Night's End.

Awards and honors
 Chicago Reader Best Actor 2017
Windy City Times 30 under 30

Personal life
Kyri identifies as queer. He has said, "I can’t say I had very many examples, of Black queer people growing up ... I spent a lot of my youth lost at sea, reconciling with my sexuality.”

Filmography

Film

Television

References

External links
 

Living people
1996 births
University of Illinois Chicago alumni
Male actors from Chicago
21st-century American male actors
American male film actors
American male stage actors
American male television actors
Queer actors
American LGBT actors
LGBT African Americans
LGBT people from Illinois
Participants in American reality television series